The 2012 I-League 2nd Division was the fifth season of the league. The league serves as the second top tier of Indian Football, using promotion and relegation with the I-League, which is top tier league of India.

Stadiums
The 2012 I-League 2nd Division will be played in 4 stadiums. Three of the Stadiums will be used for the Group Stage and one for the Final Stage.

The stadiums that will be used in the group stage are the Barabati Stadium (Orissa), Ambedkar Stadium (New Delhi) and the Satindra Mohan Dev Stadium (Assam).

Team overview

Teams and locations

Personnel and sponsoring

Managerial Changes

Group stage

Group A
Group A will take place at the Barabati Stadium in Orissa.

Group B
Group B will take place at the Ambedkar Stadium in New Delhi.

Group C
Group C will take place at the Satindra Mohan Dev Stadium in Assam.

Final round

The Final Round of the 2012 I-League 2nd Division will take place between six teams from the group stage in a single table format in which each team plays each other once at home and once away from home.

Statistics
Updated: 20 February 2012

Top goalscorers

Hat-tricks

 7  Player scored 7 goals

Scoring
 First goal of the season: Stanley Cyprian for Mohammedan against KGF Academy (1 February 2012)
 Fastest goal of the season: 15 minutes – Isa Ali for Vasco against PIFA (1 February 2012)
 Most goals in a game: 9 goals
 United Sikkim 7–2 Eagles (5 February 2012)
 Quartz 0–9 Kalighat (17 February 2012)
 Most goals scored in a game by one team: 9 goals – Kalighat 9–0 Quartz (17 February 2012)

References

I-League 2nd Division seasons
2
India